José Luis Álvarez (3 June 1917 Guatemala, Guatemala – 5 February 2012 Antigua Guatemala) was a Guatemalan artist who, from 1976 until his death, lived and painted in Antigua.  He became known as the one of the best landscape artists from Guatemala, and was part of a generation of prolific artists who, as exponents of national art, defined the Guatemalan School.  Álvarez developed a distinguished wide impasto technique, using the spatula, and a great delicacy in the use of color.

Early career 
Álvarez had exhibited his works in domestic and international solo and group exhibitions, but notably in Guatemala at the Instituto Guatemalteco Americano (IGA), the National School of Fine Arts, la Fundación Arte Paiz, Juannio National Art Exhibition, Rotary Auction, and the National Art Gallery.

 Awards
In 1938 he won second prize in the National Competition Fair November.  He also won first, second and third prizes at the Fiesta de los Morenos in Mixco, and won multiple prizes in Quetzaltenango. In the Arturo Martínez competition, won the first prize three consecutive times.

 National commissions 
In 1948, he was commissioned to help restore the National Palace of Guatemala and the Church of San Juan del Obispo. He restored altar pieces and colonial paintings. He also remade missing gilded gold leaf pieces for the colonial assemblies.

 National restoration project sponsored by UNESCO
In 1956, the Guatemalan Commission for UNESCO organized and underwrote the restoration of several paintings from the Guatemalan colonial era. Projects were carried out in specialized workshops in the Capuchin Convent in Antigua. The restorations were led by a mission headed by a British expert sent by UNESCO, Helmut Ruhemann (1891–1973), and had as national partners to Carlos Morales, Luis Álvarez, and his son, Luis Alberto Álvarez. The Ministry of Education (es), directors of national museums and the directors of the Department of Fine Arts facilitated its development. The restored works were exhibited at the National School for the Arts.  UNESCO bestowed Álvarez with a restorer diploma in 1956.

 Restoration in Guatemala City
In 1958, he returned to Guatemala City to resume restoring works that had been delayed for over half a century, carving, gilding and parts embodied colonial style. He also devoted himself to the restoration of paintings and antique images. He taught privately at the Galería Ríos, a gallery founded by Miguel Ángel Ríos (1914–1991) in the early 1950s.

 Educator
In 1959, Álvarez joined the faculty of the National School of Arts where he flourished for 27 years until he retired to continue working in his workshop in Antigua, Guatemala.

Selected works 
Álvarez, is known as a master of light who painted Guatemalan landscapes from unique perspectives. Often, Álvarez highlighted the contrast between light and shadows, creating optical illusions.

 The "Corte de Cafe" ("Court of Coffee"), is one if his well-known works, which, as of 1992, has been depicted on the back of a 50 quetzal Guatemalan currency.  The original is held by the Bank of Guatemala.

Many of Álvarez's works are on permanent exhibition at Museo de Arte.

 Alvarez painted a scene of people fleeing from volcanic lava flow, depicting people expressing distress. A road is illuminated by the light of lanterns and the bright glare of lava. The work, painted at night, is currently in a private collection in New York.
 Another work showing an erupting Volcano sold in 1961 to the Bank of Guatemala. Tabacalera Nacional then reproduced it on an Almanac.

Formal education 
At 14, Álvarez was in a workship of commercial painting.  At 15, he began studying at the National School for the Arts in Guatemala City. His teachers included Humberto Garavito (1897–1970), Enrique Acuña Orantes (1876–1946), Antonio Tejeda Fonseca (1908–1966). Federico Wilhelm Schaeffer (es) (1887–1957), Óscar González Goyrí (1887–1974), and Rafael Yela Günther (1888–1942).  At 16, he moved to the workshop called "El Tigre." There, he designed labels and tags with drawings to the decanter and Tabacalera Nacional. He rapidly adapted to his new job and was mentored by the shop teacher Flavio Salazar.

References 

 Notes

 Inline citations

Guatemalan artists
Guatemalan contemporary artists
Landscape artists
1917 births
2012 deaths
People from Guatemala City
20th-century Guatemalan painters
20th-century Guatemalan male artists
21st-century Guatemalan painters
21st-century Guatemalan male artists
20th-century Guatemalan people